Harry Lester Simms (31 January 1888 – 9 June 1942) was an English first-class cricketer. Simms was born in Adelaide, Australia but moved to England where he played cricket with Sussex from 1905 until 1913. He also played with Warwickshire and the European side based in India.

His brother, Royston, also played first-class cricket for Sussex.

References

Cricket Archive

1888 births
1942 deaths
Cricketers from Adelaide
English people of Australian descent
People educated at Lancing College
English cricketers
Sussex cricketers
Warwickshire cricketers
Europeans cricketers
Marylebone Cricket Club cricketers
North v South cricketers
Gentlemen cricketers
Gentlemen of the South cricketers
Gentlemen of England cricketers
L. G. Robinson's XI cricketers
Lord Londesborough's XI cricketers